FC Dynamo Tula was a Russian football team from Tula. It played professionally from 1995 to 2003. Their best result was 14th place in Zone Centre of the Russian Second Division in 1998. There was a fierce rivalry between the two strongest teams of Tula, and the game between FC Arsenal Tula and Dynamo was known as Derby of the Tulones (or Столкновение мечей).

Team name history
 1995–1997 FC Luch Tula
 1998–2002 FC Arsenal-2 Tula (the club was a farm team of FC Arsenal Tula during this period)
 2003 FC Dynamo Tula

External links
  Team history at KLISF

Association football clubs established in 1995
Association football clubs disestablished in 2003
Defunct football clubs in Russia
Sport in Tula, Russia
1995 establishments in Russia
2003 disestablishments in Russia